The Taunton Municipal Lighting Plant (TMLP) established in 1897, is a municipal electric utility within the city of Taunton, Massachusetts. Prior to 1897, the TMLP was the Taunton Electric Lighting Company, which lit Main Street/City Square area in 1892. It even made it possible to create the first electric car service [similar to trolleys] in the city in 1893. Today, the TMLP offer a wide arrange of services within the Greater Taunton Area, such as lighting services, an internet provider, etc. It's a large and active municipal company in the region.

External links
Official Home Page of the Taunton Municipal Lighting Plant

Companies based in Massachusetts
Municipal electric utilities of the United States
Energy in New England
Taunton, Massachusetts
American companies established in 1897
Energy companies established in 1897
1897 establishments in Massachusetts